Huldufólk 102 is a 2006 American/Icelandic co-production documentary film directed by Nisha Inalsingh about the cultural phenomenon of the Huldufólk (or "hidden folk"), mystical beings traditionally believed by many Icelanders to inhabit a parallel world hidden in the rocks and stones of the harsh Icelandic landscape.

Release

The film debuted at the 2006 Sarasota Film Festival and additionally won the Audience Award at the 2006 Camden International Film Festival.

The film premiered in Iceland at the Reykjavik Art Museum on January 31, 2008.

Soundtrack

The documentary's soundtrack features many noted Icelandic bands and artists, such as Sigur Rós, múm, and Björk.

See also
 Investigation into the Invisible World, a 2002 documentary film

References

External links

2006 films
American documentary films
Films shot in Iceland
Documentary films about the paranormal
2006 documentary films
Icelandic folklore
Icelandic documentary films
Films about elves
2000s American films